Molly Make-Believe is a 1916 silent film drama directed by J. Searle Dawley and starring Marguerite Clark. It was produced by Famous Players-Lasky and distributed by Paramount Pictures. It is based on a 1910 novel, Molly Make-Believe by Eleanor Hallowell Abbott, which was quite popular at the time. The film is now considered  lost.

Cast
Marguerite Clark - Molly
Mahlon Hamilton - Carl Stanton
Dick Gray - Bobby Meredith (*as Master Dick Gray)
Helen Dahl - Cornelia Bartlett
Gertrude Norman - Grandmother Meredith
Kate Lester - 
J. W. Johnston - Sam Rogers
Edwin Mordant - Mr. Wendell

References

External links
 
AllMovie.com
 

1916 films
American silent feature films
Lost American films
Films based on American novels
Films directed by J. Searle Dawley
Paramount Pictures films
Silent American drama films
1916 drama films
American black-and-white films
1916 lost films
Lost drama films
1910s American films